Methyclothiazide is a thiazide diuretic.

References

Diuretics
Sulfonamides
Benzothiadiazines
Organochlorides
Carbonic anhydrase inhibitors
Thiazides